William W. Wemple Jr. (March 5, 1898 - October 14, 1972) was an American lawyer and politician. He served as a member of the New York State Assembly from 1929 to 1930.

References

1898 births
1972 deaths
Union College (New York) alumni
Albany Law School alumni
New York (state) lawyers
Members of the New York State Assembly
20th-century American politicians
20th-century American lawyers